Doornspijk is a village in the Dutch province of Gelderland. It is located in the municipality of Elburg.

The village was first mentioned in 796 as Thornspiic, and is a combination of thorn and tapering land. The original village was flooded by the former Zuiderzee in 1825, and current village formed around the church after 1829.

The Dutch Reformed church was built in 1829, and has been extended into a cruciform church in 1950. Doornspijk was home to 540 people in 1840.

Doornspijk was a separate municipality until 1974, when it became a part of Elburg.

Notable people from Doornspijk
 Didericus Heineken (1730-1795), a minister of the Dutch Reformed Church, and his wife Theodora Segerina van Lom, ancestors of Freddy Heineken
Anne van Schuppen (born 1960), long-distance runner
Duncan Huisman (born 1971), racing car driver
Anke Birnie (born 1943), sculptor

References

Populated places in Gelderland
Former municipalities of Gelderland
Elburg